Zhambyl District may also refer to:
 Zhambyl District, Almaty Province, a district of Almaty Province in Kazakhstan.
 Zhambyl District, North Kazakhstan Province, a district of North Kazakhstan Province in Kazakhstan.
 Zhambyl District, Zhambyl Province, a district of Zhambyl Province in Kazakhstan.